Psyklop is a supervillain appearing in American comic books published by Marvel Comics. Created in combination by Harlan Ellison, Roy Thomas, Sal Buscema and Jim Mooney, the character first appears Avengers #88.

Fictional character biography
Psyklop is the last survivor of an intelligent insectoid semi-humanoid race which evolved from insects and existed on Earth and dominated the planet in prehistoric times; during their time, Psyklop's race prospered, but they soon fell out of favor with their Dark Gods they worshiped, and were put into a state of hibernation by them.

Eons later, Psyklop is awakened by the Dark Gods, who charge him with the responsibility of finding a power source for them, and he did so, his race would be awakened and allowed to conquer the Earth. After covertly organizing a voodoo-based cult in New Orleans through surrogates, Psyklop discovers that the Hulk possessed the power he needs to energize the Dark Gods, and captures the Hulk for study. Transporting the Hulk to his lair, Psyklop, explaining his origin and intentions to him, begins the process of shrinking the Hulk to a size where his molecular structure can be examined better. Psyklop loses track of the Hulk, accidentally sending him to a "micro-world", when Psyklop is distracted by the Avengers and the Falcon, who have traced Psyklop to his base. Battling the Avengers, Psyklop manages to blast them with a device that erases their memories and teleports them to a subway platform in New York.

Afterwards, Psyklop, after searching for the Hulk, finds him in the sub-atomic world of K'ai. Still wanting to harness the power of the Hulk, Psyklop shrinks himself to capture him. Successfully obtaining the Hulk, Psyklop returns to his base with him, only to be violently pummeled by the Hulk. As the Hulk prepares to kill Psyklop, Psyklop himself is quickly taken away by the Dark Gods, who have decided to abandon him as their agent. It is later revealed that Psyklop has been simply dumped on K'ai by the Dark Gods and was left with no way to return to his regular size.

While on K'ai, Psyklop begins to form a plan, inspired by an incident caused by the Hulk, who had accidentally kicked K'ai while leaving the planet, causing chaotic earthquakes. Creating a large drilling device, Psyklop begins to create catastrophic earthquakes on K'ai, telling the planet's inhabitants he would only stop his destruction if they worshipped him as a god; Psyklop also captures the spirits of those who died in his earthquakes, planning on giving the spirits to the Dark Gods as a power source, wanting to regain their favor. The Hulk, wanting to face this "angry god" who threatened the inhabitants of K'ai, ventures to Psyklop's headquarters with Jarella to confront the god. After destroying a robotic sentinel at Psyklop's base, the Hulk is knocked unconscious by Psyklop, who blasts him with a large projectile weapon.

Restraining the Hulk, Psyklop begins to taunt Jarella, only for the Hulk to escape. Having all his weaponry destroyed by the Hulk, Psyklop resorts to using his hypnotic powers against the Hulk, managing to brainwash him. Psyklop then sends the Hulk out to attack the inhabitants of K'ai who have begun to storm Psyklop's base. Unfortunately for Psyklop, the Hulk is returned to normal by three K'ai sorcerers and begins to advance on Psyklop. Taking Jarella hostage, Psyklop panics and begins trying to hypnotize the Hulk again, only to fail. Advancing on Psyklop, the Hulk smashes the ground hard enough to break the urn in which Psyklop kept the spirits he captured. Before he can react, Psyklop is consumed by the spirits freed from the urn; all that remains of him is a pile of ashes on the ground.

Powers and abilities
Psyklop is an inventive genius and has mastery of the advanced technology of his race. Psyklop has access to a large supply of incredibly advanced technology, including a hand-held ray-blaster firing beams of concussive force, sonic displacer beams, Spasm-rays (able to disrupt the nervous systems of his victims) and teleporters. He wears body armor of unknown materials. Psyklop has also employed giant Lemurian slug creatures, teleportation rays, shrinking rays, giant robots, planetary view-scanners, dreadnought-drill (capable of producing planet-wide earthquakes), and an essence-urn (capable of storing the life-forces of living beings).

Psyklop has a single compound eye, like all members of his race.  He can fire energy blasts from his eye, and his eye allows him to instantaneously hypnotize a victim through beams of light from his single eye.

Psyklop has enhanced strength, speed, agility, endurance, and durability, and is an average hand-to-hand combatant. He has sharpened canine teeth, and four clawed digits, including an opposable thumb, on each hand. All four of his limbs are double-jointed.

In other media

Television
 Psyklop makes a cameo appearance in the Spider-Man and His Amazing Friends episode "The Prison Plot". He appears as an illusion created by Mastermind.

References

External links
 

Comics characters introduced in 1971
Characters created by Harlan Ellison
Characters created by Jim Mooney
Characters created by Roy Thomas
Characters created by Sal Buscema
Fictional characters with superhuman durability or invulnerability
Fictional mass murderers
Marvel Comics characters with superhuman strength
Marvel Comics supervillains